Holocheila is a genus of flowering plant in the family Lamiaceae, first described as a genus in 1962. It contains only one known species, Holocheila longipedunculata. It is endemic to Yunnan Province in China.

References

Lamiaceae
Endemic flora of Yunnan
Monotypic Lamiaceae genera